Norman Edward Albert Adams RA (9 February 1927 – 9 March 2005) was a British artist, and professor of painting at the Royal Academy Schools.

He was married to the English poet and artist Anna Adams (1926–2011).

References

External links
 

1927 births
2005 deaths
Keepers of the Royal Academy
Royal Academicians